Inline engine may refer to:

 In general use it refers to any type of straight engine
 In US aviation use it refers to an inline non-radial reciprocating cylinder engine: Inline engine (aeronautics)